Add It Up (1981–1993) is a compilation album released by Violent Femmes in 1993.

Track listing

Personnel 
 Gordon Gano – vocals, guitar
 Brian Ritchie – bass, vocals
 Victor DeLorenzo – drums, vocals
 Ashwin Batish – sitar on "Lies"

Charts

References

Violent Femmes compilation albums
1993 compilation albums
Slash Records compilation albums